Namas may refer to:

 Namas (rishi), a Hindu rishi (sage)
 Nama people, an African ethnic group of South Africa, Namibia and Botswana
 Namas Chandra (born 1952), Indian-American engineering professor
 Nămaş, a village in Bistra Commune, Alba County, Romania
 Namaste, a customary greeting from the Sanskrit for "bow, obesiance"
 Keshava Namas, 24 names of Bhagavan in Hinduism
 The former National Measurement Accreditation Service, formed in 1985, which in 1995 became the United Kingdom Accreditation Service, when it merged with the National Accreditation Council for Certification Bodies
 Al-Namas, a governorate in 'Asir Province, Saudi Arabia

See also
Namo (disambiguation)